List of Ministers of Finance of Slovenia since 1990:

See also
Economy of Slovenia

References

External links
Ministry of Finance

Finance
Finance
Politicians
Economy of Slovenia